Holiday Heart is a 2000 television film directed by Robert Townsend and starring Ving Rhames, Alfre Woodard, Jesika Reynolds, and Mykelti Williamson. It aired on the cable TV channel Showtime, and was distributed on DVD by Metro-Goldwyn-Mayer. It was based on a play by Cheryl L. West, and involves a gay drag queen befriending a single mother and her daughter and trying to protect them from the criminal environment around them. It was nominated for a Golden Globe Award, for Woodard's performance, among other award nominations.

Plot
Holiday Heart (Ving Rhames) is a gay African American man who performs as a drag queen at a popular nightclub in Chicago. He is talented, tough, compassionate, and a dedicated Christian. After his boyfriend dies, he befriends a down on her luck, drug addicted, single woman, Wanda (Alfre Woodard) and her young daughter Niki (Jesika Reynolds). Holiday offers them a stable home and becomes a much-needed father figure for Niki.

However, things go astray when the mother becomes addicted to drugs again and after a series of bad relationships, starts one up with a successful drug dealer Silas (Mykelti Williamson) who is as homophobic as he is chauvinist. Silas gives Holiday money and insists, with some threats, that he stay out of their life, which Holiday agrees to do before preparing to move to Paris.

Wanda and Holiday have a fight, and Holiday reveals that he was raped in jail. He was sent there after killing a man to protect his mother.

Niki is then left alone. Silas has to go away on a "business" trip, because Wanda starts to use too much of his product, and she becomes a prostitute to feed her drug addiction. Holiday steps in to take care of Niki and raises her as his own daughter. Under Holiday's guidance, Niki is baptized at the local Church, and graduates from elementary school with honors.

Soon after, a more friendly Silas re-enters their lives, and is thankful for what Holiday has done. He has been getting a house in Florida ready for Wanda and Niki, but is still earning a living by selling drugs. Holiday and Silas become a sort of "odd couple" as Niki begins junior high school, with Silas more willing to respect and tolerate Holiday.

After Silas brings Niki along on one of his illicit sales, she runs away and bumps into her mother, who is in a flophouse turning tricks. Ricky, Wanda's new boyfriend, shows pedophilic interest in Niki and Wanda agrees to prostitute her in exchange for heroin. However, Niki escapes as Ricky beats Wanda in anger. Silas finds Niki and leaves her in the care of Holiday.

As an angry teenager, Niki begins to rebel, and Holiday loses his temper and slaps her. Right before Christmas, Wanda appears at the gay nightclub where Holiday works and wants his help in getting clean and sober. The two walk to Holiday's car, with a bike for Niki, when Ricky and his associate, assault Wanda and steals Niki's bike gift. Holiday manages to beat them up, but not before Ricky gets into his car and runs over Wanda, killing her. He then is stopped by officers.

The film then shifts to a few months later, where Niki is home from "spring break" and visiting her mother's grave with Holiday and Silas. Silas has returned and informs Niki and Holiday that when they get back from a trip to Paris, he has a surprise waiting for them.

Cast

References
Holiday Heart, Showtime promotional VHS, 2001

External links

2000 films
2000s Christmas drama films
2000 LGBT-related films
American Christmas drama films
American LGBT-related television films
African-American LGBT-related films
Christmas television films
Transgender-related films
Cross-dressing in American films
Films directed by Robert Townsend
Films scored by Stephen James Taylor
African-American drama films
2000 drama films
Drag (clothing)-related films
Films about dysfunctional families
Films about domestic violence
Films about drugs
Films set in Chicago
American drama television films
2000s English-language films
2000s American films